The Lake Street Bridge is a bridge that spans the Chicago River in downtown Chicago, Illinois, United States.

References

External links
 

Bridges in Chicago
Truss bridges in the United States
Railroad bridges in Illinois
Road bridges in Illinois
Bascule bridges in the United States